PowNews was a Dutch television news show which was broadcast on Nederland 3 from Amsterdam on Monday to Friday evenings by public broadcaster PowNed. The first broadcast was on 6 September 2010. The show ceased to exist in its current form on 5 December 2014 and was replaced by a 45-minute-long weekly show, primetime on Thursday evening.

PowNews was presented by Dominique Weesie. Some of the reporters associated with the show were Rutger Castricum, Jan Roos, Jojanneke van den Berge, Daan Nieber
and Danny Ghosen.

The show was a mixture of news and entertainment, with an often provocative character and bordering on satire.

References

External links
  PowNews

2010 Dutch television series debuts
2010s Dutch television series
Dutch television news shows
Dutch-language television shows
Dutch comedy television series
Dutch satirical television shows
NPO 3 original programming